Belphegor is the name of a demon.

Belphegor

Literature and arts
 Belfagor arcidiavolo, a novella by Niccolò Machiavelli written between 1518 and 1527
 , one of La Fontaine's Fables (1693), adapted from the Machiavelli novella
 Belfagor, a 1923 Italian opera by Ottorino Respighi, based on the Machiavelli novella
Belphégor (novel), a 1927 horror novel by Arthur Bernède, and works based on the novel:
 , a film by Henri Desfontaines
Belphegor, or Phantom of the Louvre (1965 miniseries), a French television mini-series 
Belphegor (comics), comic sequel of the miniseries
Belphegor, Phantom of the Louvre, a 2001 French film
 , a 2001 French animated TV series
 The Curse of Belphegor, a 1966 Franco-Italian film

Popular music
Belfegore, an early 1980s German gothic new wave band
Belphegor (band), an Austrian blackened death metal band est. 1991

Fictional characters
Belfaygor of Bourne, a character in Jack Pumpkinhead of Oz
Belphegor, a character from the anime/manga Reborn!
 Baalphegor, a female archdevil, consort of Mephistopheles —ruler of the Eighth Layer of Hell— in Dungeons & Dragons.

Technology
Citroën Belphégor, the popular moniker of a line of French trucks
PZL M-15 Belphegor, an agricultural jet biplane
SNCAC NC.3021 Belphégor, French high altitude research aircraft

Other
Nirodia belphegor, butterfly species

See also 
 Belphegor's prime, a palindromic prime number